Deltistes is a genus of North American ray-finned fish in the family Catostomidae. It contains the modern D. luxatus found in California and Oregon, and the extinct D. owyhee Miller, 1967 and D. ellipticus Miller, 1967 both from the Glenns Ferry Formation of Idaho.

References

Catostomidae
Taxonomy articles created by Polbot
Fish genera with one living species